The Grierson Awards are awards set up by The Grierson Trust to recognise innovative and exciting documentary films, created to commemorate the life and work of the pioneering Scottish documentary filmmaker John Grierson.

The inaugural Awards were given in 1972 and since then have occurred annually. In 2000 The Grierson Trust forged a link with the UK Film Council in order to expand the awards and add prestige to the awards. The awards have grown in stature and recognition over the years.

John Grierson
John Grierson was a leading documentary filmmaker, and he has also been attributed to have coined the name "documentary". He was born in Scotland in 1898. Grierson was the founder of a new movement of documentary film in the 1930s. He started the Empire Marketing Board Film Unit, and in 1933 the GPO Film Unit, gathering together such diverse and exciting talents as Humphrey Jennings, Paul Rotha and Alberto Cavalcanti.  His ground-breaking work on the Scottish herring fleet, Drifters, had its premiere in 1929 alongside the first British showing of Sergei Eisenstein’s Battleship Potemkin. In 1936, he produced the celebrated Night Mail, directed by Harry Watt with script by W.H. Auden and score by Benjamin Britten.

Grierson: Sheffields

Sheffield DocFest works in conjunction with The Grierson Trust to present Grierson: Sheffield. There are three awards presented by the Grierson Trust, the Green Award, which recognises a documentary exploring environmental issues or that has made a contribution to the climate change debate. The Innovation Award, a documentary that exhibits innovation in format, style, technique or content and The Youth Jury Award. The Youth Jury is a panel of 16- to 21-year-olds that are selected by Channel 4 and 4Talent.

Awards
The Grierson Awards are presented annually in a range of categories.

In 2022 these were: 

Best Single Documentary - Domestic
Best Single Documentary - International
Best Current Affairs Documentary
Best Music Documentary
Best Sports Documentary
Best History Documentary
Best Science Documentary
Best Natural History or Environmental Documentary
Best Entertaining Documentary
Best Constructed Documentary Series
Best Documentary Series
Best Cinema Documentary
Best Student Documentary
Best Documentary Short
Best Documentary Presenter
Grierson Trustees' Award
Grierson Hero of the Year Award

Past winners
Past award winners 1971–present

2015 winners

Best Documentary on a Contemporary Theme - The Paedophile Hunter, dir: Dan Reed
Best Documentary on Current Affairs - Our War: Goodbye Afghanistan, dir Rowan Deacon
Best Arts Documentary - 20,000 Days on Earth, dir: Iain Forsyth and Jane Pollard
Best Historical Documentary - Our World War: The First Day, dir: Bruce Goodison
Best Science or Natural History Documentary - Curing Cancer, dir Brian Woods
Best Entertaining Documentary - Gogglebox - Episode 6, dir: Tina Alexander
Best Drama Documentary - The Romanians are Coming, dir James Bluemel
Best Cinema Documentary - Virunga, dir Orlando von Einsiedel
Best Newcomer Documentary - The Lost Gold of the Highlands (Garnet’s Gold), dir: Ed Perkins
Best Student Documentary - The Wolf, The Ship and the Little Green Bag, dir: Kathryn MacCorgarry Gray
Documentary Presenter of the Year - Grayson Perry for Who Are You?

2014 winners

Best Documentary on a Contemporary Issue - The Murder Trial, dir: Nick Holt
Best Cinema Documentary - Cutie and the Boxer, dir: Zachary Heinzerling
The Trustees’ Award - Alex Graham
Best Documentary Series - Educating Yorkshire, dir: David Brindley, Grace Reynold

2013 winners

Best Documentary on a Contemporary Issue - Law of the Jungle, dir: Michael Christoffersen, Hans La Cour
Best Cinema Documentary - The House I Live In, dir: Eugene Jarecki
The Trustees’ Award - John Battsek
Best Documentary Newcomer - High Tech, Low Life, dir: Steve Maing

2012 winners

Best Documentary on a Contemporary Issue - Hell and Back Again, dir: Danfung Dennis
Best Cinema Documentary - Bobby Fischer Against the World, dir: Liz Garbus
The Trustees' Award - Kevin Macdonald

2011 winners

Best Documentary on a Contemporary Issue - Secret Iraq - The Insurgency, dir: Sam Collyns
Best Documentary on the Arts - Bird on a Wire, dir: Tony Palmer
Best Historical Documentary - Fire in Babylon, dir: Stevan Riley
Best Cinema Documentary - The Arbor, dir: Clio Barnard
The Trustees’ Award - John Pilger

2010 winners

Best Documentary on a Contemporary Issue - Moving to Mars, dir: Mat Whitecross
Best Documentary on the Arts - Arena: T.S. Eliot, dir: Adam Low
Best Historical Documentary - Requiem for Detroit, dir: Julien Temple
The Award for Most Entertaining Documentary - Exit Through the Gift Shop, dir: Banksy
Best Cinema Documentary - Mugabe and the White African, dir: Lucy Bailey, Andrew Thompson

2009 winners

Best Documentary on a Contemporary Issue - Afghan Star, dir: Havana Marking
Best Documentary on the Arts - The Mona Lisa Curse, dir: Mandy Chang
Best Historical Documentary - Thriller in Manila, dir: John Dower
The Award for Most Entertaining Documentary - The Yes Men: Fix the World, dir: Andy Bichibaum, Mike Bonnano
Best Cinema Documentary - Burma VJ, dir: Anders Østergaard
Trustees' Award - Norma Percy

2008 winners

Best Documentary on a Contemporary Issue - The Lie of the Land, dir: Molly Dineen
Best Documentary on the Arts - Here's Jonny, dir: Adam Lavis, William Hood, Katrina Mansoor
Best Historical Documentary - 1983 – The Brink of Apocalypse, dir: Henry Chancellor
The Award for Most Entertaining Documentary - Please Vote for Me, dir: Weijun Chen, Don Edkins, Mette Heide
Best Drama Documentary - Battle for Haditha, dir: Nick Broomfield
Best Cinema Documentary - Joy Division, dir: Grant Gee

2007 winners

Best Documentary on a Contemporary Issue - Rain In My Heart, dir: Paul Watson
Best Documentary on the Arts - Imagine...Who Cares About Art?, dir: Sam Hobkinson
Best Historical Documentary - Hungary 1956: Our Revolution, dir: Mark Kidel
Best Documentary on Science or the Natural World - Monkeys, Rats and Me, dir: Adam Wishart
The Frontier Post Award for Most Entertaining Documentary - Ray Gosling OAP, dir: Amanda Reilly
Best Drama Documentary - Consent, dir: Katie Baliff
Best Documentary Series - Anatomy Of A Crime, dir: Steph Atkinson
Best Cinema Documentary - Deep Water, dir: Louise Osmond and Jerry Rothwell
Best Newcomer - No Man is an Island, dir: Sonja Linden
 Trustees' Award - Paul Watson

2006 winners

Best Documentary on a Contemporary Issue - Asylum, dir: Peter Gordon
Best Documentary on the Arts - Take That For The Record, dir: David Notman-Watt
Best Historical Documentary - How Vietnam Was Lost (Two Days In October), dir: Robert Kenner
Best Documentary on Science or the Natural World - The Natural World: The Queen Of Trees, dir: Victoria Stone and Mark Deeble
The Frontier Post Award for Most Entertaining Documentary - Ramsay's Kitchen Nightmares: "Prog 3 - Momma Charris", dir: Christine Hall
Best Drama Documentary - The Year London Blew Up, dir: Edmund Coulthard
Best International Cinema Documentary - Storyville: Darwin's Nightmare, dir: Hubert Sauper
Best Newcomer - Disabled and Looking For Love, dir: Clare Richards
 Trustees' Award - Mike Salisbury

References

External links
Official website

British documentary film awards